Cavenago may refer to:

 Cavenago d'Adda, a comune in the province of Lodi, Lombardy, Italy
 Cavenago di Brianza, a comune in the province of Monza and Brianza, Lombardy, Italy

See also 
 Cavenagh (disambiguation)